Virginia's 51st House of Delegates district, in Prince William County, Virginia, elects one of the 100 members of the Virginia House of Delegates, the lower house of the state's bicameral legislature.

The 51st district has been represented by Democrat Briana Sewell since 2022.

District officeholders

Electoral history
In December 2020, Briana Sewell announced her intention to run for Delegate of District 51. She is endorsed by Hala Ayala, the district's current delegate who is vacating the seat to run for Virginia's Lieutenant Governor, a move announced in July 2020. She is also endorsed by U.S. Representative Gerry Connolly, with whom she has worked in the past. Briana served as Chief of Staff to the Prince William County Chair At-Large, Ann Wheeler, and was previously the Political Director and Senior Organizer for the Virginia Campaign for a Family Friendly Economy. According to her candidate website, Briana earned her Bachelor’s degree in Public Policy from the College of William and Mary and a Master’s degree in Public Administration from American University. She is running as a Democrat. 

Republican Rich Anderson represented District 51 from 2010 to 2018. In November 2017, he was defeated by Democrat Hala Ayala in an election where the Medicaid expansion figured significantly; Anderson opposed while Ayala supported the policy, which ultimately passed, making an additional 14,000 Prince William County residents eligible for the low-income health insurance program. 

Anderson declared his candidacy to challenge Ayala in 2019.

Ayala retired to run for lieutenant governor she went on to lose the general election. She was succeeded by Briana Sewell to represent the district.

References

External links
 

Virginia House of Delegates districts
Prince William County, Virginia